Samuel Kenneth Gruneisen (January 16, 1941 – September 28, 2012) was an American football player and coach.  He played professionally as a center in the American Football League (AFL) for the San Diego Chargers and in the National Football League (NFL) for the Chargers and Houston Oilers. Gruneisen played college football Villanova University.  He kicked two point after touchdowns and a 26-yard field goal in Villanova's 17–9 victory over Wichita State in the 1961 Sun Bowl.

After his playing career, Gruneisen coached at several levels of the sport.

See also
 List of American Football League players

References

1941 births
2012 deaths
American football centers
California Golden Bears football coaches
Eastern Michigan Eagles football coaches
Gardner–Webb Runnin' Bulldogs football coaches
Houston Oilers players
Los Angeles Raiders coaches
San Diego Chargers players
San Jose State Spartans football coaches
Villanova Wildcats football players
United States Football League coaches
Sportspeople from Louisville, Kentucky
Players of American football from Louisville, Kentucky
American Football League players